Natasha Marie Harding (born 2 March 1989) is a Welsh footballer who plays for the Welsh national women's team and Aston Villa in the FA WSL club. A wide or central forward, Harding began her career with Cardiff City and has also played in the FA WSL for Bristol Academy and Manchester City. Her secondary school was Ysgol Gyfun Cwm Rhymni.

Club career
Harding began her career at Cardiff City and made her first team debut in January 2007, during a 4–0 Welsh Women's Cup quarter final win over Newport Strikers. Harding came on as a second-half substitute for Gwennan Harries. She subsequently represented the club in the 2007–08 UEFA Women's Cup.

She went on to captain Cardiff City, then joined Bristol Academy ahead of the 2012 FA WSL campaign. Bristol manager Mark Sampson said of Harding: "Tash will really bring another dimension to our forward play, a striker who can play off the shoulder and with great speed was something we were missing last season so it will give us far more variation to our play going forward." At the end of the 2014 season Harding signed for the Washington Spirit, but her move fell through over visa issues and she signed instead for Manchester City.

In January 2016, Harding was sold by Manchester City, who had signed Swedish forward Kosovare Asllani. Later that week she signed for Liverpool. Harding left Liverpool Ladies in December 2017. Reading Women snapped up the Welsh international on a free transfer in January 2018 Since joining the Royals in 2018, Harding has been named captain. On 3 May 2022, Reading announced that Harding would leave the club at the end of the season.

International career

Harding played five times for the Wales Under-19 team in season 2007–08. She made her senior international debut, aged 19, as a late substitute in a 2–0 defeat to Switzerland in Oberdorf on 8 May 2008.

Harding scored her first goals for Wales on 20 June 2012 in a UEFA Qualifying match against Israel at the Racecourse Ground in Wrexham. She scored a hat-trick in a 5–0 win to cap a fine evening both personally and for her country.

As a student at UWIC, Harding was called–up to represent Great Britain at the 2011 World University Games in Shenzhen, China.

On 12 April 2022, she played her 100th match for Wales in a 3–0 win over Kazakhstan in the 2023 FIFA Women's World Cup qualification.

Career statistics

Club

Honours
Individual
Welsh Footballer of the Year: 2016

References

External links

Harding at UEFA
Harding at FAW
Harding at Bristol Academy

1989 births
Living people
Footballers from Caerphilly
Cardiff City Ladies F.C. players
Bristol Academy W.F.C. players
Manchester City W.F.C. players
Liverpool F.C. Women players
Reading F.C. Women players
Women's Super League players
Wales women's international footballers
FA Women's National League players
People educated at Ysgol Gyfun Cwm Rhymni
Welsh women's footballers
Women's association football forwards
FIFA Century Club
Aston Villa W.F.C. players